Duffy and the Devil (1973) is a book by Margot Zemach and her husband Harvey Fichstrom (as Harve Zemach). In 1974 it was a finalist
for the National Book Award, Children's Literature
and winner of the Caldecott Medal for illustration.

The U.S. Library of Congress credits "a Cornish tale retold by Harve Zemach" and a British edition was published by Kestrel Books in 1974, which catalogs with the full title Duffy and the Devil: a Cornish tale retold.

References

1973 children's books
American picture books
Caldecott Medal–winning works
Children's fiction books
Books illustrated by Margot Zemach
National Book Award for Young People's Literature winning works